Kokshetau City Administration is an administrative-territorial unit of Akmola Region with the status equal to that of the districts in northern Kazakhstan, one of the two city administrations in the region. It is located in the north of the Akmola Region. The area of the unit is .2 The administrative center is Kokshetau. It includes the administrative territorial entities of Kokshetau, Krasny Yar, Stantsyonny, and Kyzylzhulduz.
Population:

Administrative-Territorial Division  
Kokshetau City Administration includes one settlement administration (which consists of the work settlement of Stantsyonny) and the Krasnoyarsk rural district, which includes two rural settlements (the villages of Krasny Yar and Kyzylzhulduz).

Demographics

References

Notes

Akmola Region